Slaven may refer to:

 Slaven (given name)
 Slaven (surname)
 14708 Slaven, an asteroid